Zachery is a male given name and variant of Zachary. It may refer to:
 Zachery Bradford (born 1999), American athlete specializing in pole vault
 Zachery Byrd, actor
 Zachery Kouwe (born 1978), communications strategist and journalist
 Zachery Peacock (born 1987), American basketball player
 Zachery Pop (born 1996), Canadian baseball pitcher
 Zachery Ty Bryan (born 1981), American actor and film producer
 Zachery Ziemek (born 1993), American athlete 
Zachery is a name that means GOD REMEMBERS

See also 
 James Zachery (1958–1994), American football player